Santobello v. New York, 404 U.S. 257 (1971), is a United States Supreme Court case in which the Court ruled that the sentence of the defendant should be vacated because the plea agreement specified that the prosecutor would not recommend a sentence, but the prosecutor breached the agreement by recommending the maximum sentence.

Case background 
The defendant was charged with two felony counts of gambling; the district attorney agreed to a plea agreement where the defendant would plead guilt to the lesser offense of "possession of gambling records", with a maximum sentence of one year in jail. The prosecutor also agreed to not make a recommendation to the court regarding the sentence. The Court accepted the plea in June 1969 and set a date for subsequent sentencing. However, there was significant delay and Santobello did not appear for sentencing until January 1970. By this time, the original presiding judge had retired and the prosecutor had been replaced. The second prosecutor was ignorant of the plea agreement made by the predecessor and recommended, against the terms of the agreement, the maximum one-year sentence. However the new sentencing judge declared that his decision of the maximum one-year sentence was not influenced by the district attorney, and therefore there was no need to adjourn the sentencing, given the Santobello's probation report, showing him as a "professional criminal". The Court subsequently upheld that the prosecutor had breached the agreement.

References

External links
 

United States criminal due process case law
United States plea bargaining case law
United States Supreme Court cases
United States Supreme Court cases of the Burger Court
1971 in United States case law